St. Johns Catholic Cemetery is a cemetery in Orange in the U.S. state of New Jersey.

Notable burials
 Tony Galento (1910–1979), heavyweight boxer, nicknamed "Two Ton Tony".
 Daniel F. Minahan (1877–1947), represented New Jersey's 6th congressional district from 1919 to 1921 and again from 1923 to 1925.

References

External links
 St. John's Cemetery at The Political Graveyard
 Saint Johns Catholic Cemetery at Find A Grave
 Saint John Cemetery

Cemeteries in Essex County, New Jersey
Roman Catholic cemeteries in New Jersey